H4CBD (Hydrogenated CBD), (Hexahydrocannibidiol), (CyclohexylCBD) is a cannabinoid that was first synthesized by the Todd group in 1940 derived from the catalytic hydrogenation of cannabidiol. 

It's important to note that H4CBD, and H2-CBD and 8,9-Dihydrocannabidiol have also been referred to as "Hydrogenated CBD" which may cause confusion.

Pharmacology 
In 2006 it was discovered that H4CBD has a binding affinity of 145nM at CB1 receptor and potential anti-inflammatory effects independent of its cannabinoid receptor action

See also 
 H2-CBD (also hydrogenated CBD)
 8,9-Dihydrocannabidiol (one of the two components in H2CBD)
 Hexahydrocannabinol (hydrogenated THC)
 4'-Fluorocannabidiol
 7-Hydroxycannabidiol
 Abnormal cannabidiol
 Cannabidiol dimethyl ether
 Delta-6-cannabidiol

References 

Cannabinoids